Wiegers is a Dutch patronymic surname. The given name Wieger is a forms of the Germanic Wichard, from Wîh- ("battle") and -hard ("strong"). People with this surname include:

Ben Wiegers (fl. 2006), Dutch curler and curling coach
Jan Wiegers (1893–1959), Dutch expressionist painter
Karl Wiegers (born 1953), American software engineer
Patrick Wiegers (born 1990), German football goalkeeper
Sandra Wiegers (born 1974), Dutch volleyball player

See also
Wieger (disambiguation)
Wiegert, surname
Wiggers, surname of the same origin

References

Dutch-language surnames
Patronymic surnames